The Spin*Cycle (also known as The Spin*Cycle Mixshow Radio) is a radio station on iHeartRadio and Clear Channel HD2's across the country that plays commercial free mixes of Top40, Rhythmic and Dance remixes 24/7. The program also doubles as a weekly mixshow that airs on selective Clear Channel-owned Top 40 and Rhythmic outlets.

History
The Spin*Cycle was launched nationally in 2007 as one of Clear Channel Communications Format Lab channels distributed to company HD2 radio stations and streamed online. It is one of twelve Dance-formatted stations currently being offered by iHeartRadio, along with EDC Radio, Club Jam Dance/Hits/EDM/Retro, Evolution, Tornamexa, Trancid, Pride Radio, Dance Nation 90s, and Masters of the Mix (the latter is notable for focusing on urban music).

Programming
Originally part of the weekend club programming lineup at WFLZ/Tampa, Florida, The Spin*Cycle features continuous mixes of Top 40, Rhythmic and Dance hits. The station bills itself as "The only 24/7 Mixshow Channel" and "Mixing and Remixing the Hits - 24/7" - using mixshow DJs from Clear Channel Top 40 and Rhythmic outlets in hourly sets.

At approximately 3 or 4 minutes after the hour, a 30-second promo is introduced, starting with the exact name of the station (not its branding) and the city followed by "And now, another non-stop mix" and finally the name of the upcoming DJ is spoken out. Then the mix starts instantly.

As of August 2019, the Spin Cycle picked up new competition with Entercom’s launch of the social media-driven “Fire Lane” platform.

Mix Show DJs
Goofy Whitekid (WFLZ/Tampa)
Gonzo & Nate (WNCI/Columbus, Ohio)
VJ KiddLeow (WIHT/Washington, DC)
DeToto (Remixer/Producer, Columbus, Ohio)
Doug Kramer (internationally syndicated www.dougkramerlive.com)
Oso Fresh (KKRZ/Portland, Oregon)
DJ KConn (WFLZ/Tampa)
Brian Fink & Jaime Ferreira (WFLZ/Tampa)
DJ Pup Dawg (WJMN/Boston)
DJ Vince 1 (WJMN/Boston)
Ratboy & StayPuf (WFLZ/Tampa)
Chris Styles (The Heat/Sirius XM Radio)
Maurice Halsted (Chicago, IL)
Jay Mac (Atlanta)

External links
Spin*Cycle Mixshow website
Spin*Cycle Mixshow on Facebook

IHeartMedia
IHeartRadio digital channels
Dance radio stations
HD Radio
Radio stations established in 2007